Murg station could refer to:

 Murg (Baden) station in Murg, Baden-Württemberg, Germany
 Murg railway station in Quarten, Switzerland